Matjaž Vrhovnik (born May 6, 1972) is a former Slovenian former alpine skier.

Vrhovnik has one victory in Alpine Skiing World Cup, from 2000 in slalom. That same year, he also finished 3rd in the overall slalom standings. He won 3 more podiums in World Cup, all in slalom.

World Cup results

Season standings

Race podiums

References 

1972 births
Living people
Slovenian male alpine skiers